Real is the second full-length solo album by Christian rock singer and Stryper frontman Michael Sweet, released in 1995 by Benson Music Group.

The album features a softer, mellower sound than the previous album. There's also an acoustic version of Stryper's hit "Always There for You".

Though it received less acclaim than its predecessor, the album achieved three No. 1 singles and received a Dove award nomination.

A music video for the title track was released alongside it.

Track listing
All songs written by Michael Sweet, except where noted.

"Color Blind" - 3:30
"Second Chance" - 4:10
"Ticket to Freedom" - 4:11
"The River" - 3:20
"Always There for You" - 4:09
"Real" - 5:11
"Baby Doll" - 4:19
"Why" - 4:22
"Remember Me" (Sweet, Doug Beiden) - 4:06
"Heaven Waits for You" - 3:10

Personnel
Michael Sweet - lead vocals, acoustic and electric guitars
Mike Slamer - electric guitar, guitar solo on track 1
Boba Elefante - bass guitar
Jamie Wollam - drums
John Andrew Schreiner - organ, piano, strings
Waddy Wachtel - guitar solo on tracks 7-9
Eric Darken - percussion
Micah Wilshire, Angelo Petrucci - additional backing vocals

References

1995 albums
Michael Sweet albums